Metro cuadrado is a 2011 Chilean drama film directed and written by Nayra Ilic, and filmed in Santiago, Chile.

Plot
The movie follows the story of Francisca, a young woman who has recently moved into an apartment with her boyfriend, Andrés. As she unpacks and builds her new life with her partner, her emotions are gradually deconstructed, and the film observes how everyday life can challenge the idea of living as a couple. The film quietly critiques the traditional notion of family, leaving clichés behind.

Critics
The film has been well received by critics, with Variety.com saying: "Challenging herself to make a genuinely cinematic experience almost exclusively inside the confines of a big-city apartment, debuting Chilean writer-director Nayra Ilic surpasses her test with the sharply observed Square Meter".

Cast
 Natalia Grez as Francisca
 Álvaro Vergura as Andrés
 Fernanda Urrejola as Romina
 Boris Quercia as The Father
 Consuelo Holzapfel as Andrea
 Nicolás Poblete as Nico
 Nicolás Botinelli as Eduardo
 Simon Bagioli as Gaspar
 NEA as The Band

See also
 Cinema of Chile

References

External links
 

2011 films
2011 drama films
Chilean drama films
Films about writers
Films shot in Chile
2010s Spanish-language films
2010s Chilean films